Andy Steven Martínez Chiroque (born 28 September 1993) is a Peruvian athlete specialising in the sprinting events. He won the 100 metres gold medal at the 2014 Ibero-American Championships with a new national record of 10.30.

Personal bests

Competition record

References

1993 births
Living people
Peruvian male sprinters
National University of San Marcos alumni
Athletes (track and field) at the 2018 South American Games
Athletes (track and field) at the 2019 Pan American Games
Pan American Games competitors for Peru